Sugar and spice, 'sugar 'n' spice, and sugar & spice is a linguistic irreversible binomial and may refer to:

Books
 "Sugar and spice and everything nice", a line from the nursery rhyme "What Are Little Boys Made Of?"
 Sugar and Spice (novel), a 2010 novel by Lauren Conrad
Sugar and Spice, play by Nigel Williams (author)

Film and TV
 Sugar & Spice, a 2001 American film
 Sugar and Spice (2006 film), a 2006 Japanese film

Television
 Sugar and Spice (Australian TV series), an Australian children's television series that ran from 1988 to 1989
 "Sugar & Spice" (Picket Fences), which generated controversy because it included a lesbian kiss
 Sugar and Spice (UK TV series), a show which was shown on Channel 5
 Sugar and Spice (American TV series), a 1990 American sitcom

Music
 Sugar 'n' Spice, Spice (Canadian band)

Albums
 Sugar 'n' Spice (Martha Reeves and the Vandellas album), 1967
 Sugar & Spice (Mýa album), 2006
 Sugar 'n' Spice (Peggy Lee album), 1962
 Sugar and Spice (The Cryan' Shames album), 1966
 Sugar and Spice (The Searchers album), 1963

Songs
 "Sugar and Spice" (Madness song), a 2009 song by Madness
 "Sugar and Spice" (The Searchers song), a 1963 song by The Searchers, and covered in 1966 by The Cryan' Shames
 "Sugar and Spice", a 1969 song by The Archies from Jingle Jangle album
 "Sugar & Spice", a 2013 single by Icon for Hire
 "Sugar n Spice", a song by Yemi Alade from Mama Africa

Other uses
 Sugar and Spice, a New Zealand comic duo in the 1990s, with Jonathan Brugh and Jason Hoyte
 Sugar and Spice (drag queens), American twins and drag performers who rose to prominence on TikTok and competed on season 15 of RuPaul's Drag Race